Allan Kane (born March 19, 1948) is a Canadian former athlete who competed in pole vault.

A native of Burnaby, British Columbia, Kane was a silver medalist in pole vault at the 1970 British Commonwealth Games in Edinburgh and won Canada's national championship in 1973. He represented Canada in two editions of the Pan American Games, placing sixth at the 1971 Pan American Games and fifth at the 1975 Pan American Games.

Kane was a track and field competitor for Simon Fraser University.

References

External links
Alan Kane at World Athletics

1948 births
Living people
Canadian male pole vaulters
Sportspeople from Burnaby
Simon Fraser Red Leafs players
Commonwealth Games silver medallists for Canada
Commonwealth Games medallists in athletics
Medallists at the 1970 British Commonwealth Games
Athletes (track and field) at the 1970 British Commonwealth Games
Athletes (track and field) at the 1971 Pan American Games
Athletes (track and field) at the 1975 Pan American Games
Pan American Games track and field athletes for Canada